Shengzhou, formerly Shengxian or Sheng County, is a county-level city in central Zhejiang, south of the Hangzhou Bay, and is the south-eastern part of the prefecture-level city of Shaoxing. It is about 1.5 hours drive from the provincial capital of Hangzhou through the Hangzhou-Ningbo, Shangyu-Sanmen Expressway.
As of the 2020 census, its population was 675,226, but 1,094,262 lived in the built-up area made of Shengzhou City and Xinchang County largely being conurbated.

Economy
The city is the national and international top producer of ties.

Art
Shengzhou is the origin of the Yue opera, the second most popular Chinese opera.

Administrative divisions
As of 2020, Shengzhou is divided into 4 Subdistricts, 10 Towns and 1 Township.

Subdistricts
Shanhu Subdistrict (剡湖街道)
Sanjiang Subdistrict (三江街道)
Lushan Subdistrict (鹿山街道)
Pukou Subdistrict (浦口街道)

Towns (镇, zhen)
Ganlin (甘霖) 
Changle (长乐)
Chongren (崇仁)
Huangze (黄泽)
Sanjie (三界)
Shihuang (石璜)
Gulai (谷来)
Xianyan (仙岩)
Jinting (金庭)
Xiawang (下王)

Township (乡, xiang)
Guimen (贵门)

Climate

Transportation
Shengzhou North railway station
Shengzhou Xinchang railway station

Food
Shengzhou is famous for its variety of local snacks and southeast China style dishes. Examples include: Xiaolongbao (小笼包),  Doufubao (豆腐包), Youtiao, and Shengzhou Chaoniangao (嵊州炒年糕).

References

 
County-level cities in Zhejiang
Shaoxing